About Love is the second studio album by French female band, the Plastiscines.

About Love was recorded in Los Angeles in February 2009. It contains twelve tracks including the singles "Barcelona", "Bitch" and "I Am Down" which were featured in the episode "They Shoot Humphreys, Don't They?" (Episode 9, of the Third Season) of Gossip Girl. Its highest chart position in France was 138th. It fell out in 179th place on 22 February 2010. The French edition of Rolling Stone classified it as the 100th best French rock Album.

Track listing
 "I Could Rob You" – 3:26
 "Barcelona" – 3:21
 "Bitch" – 3:07
 "Camera" – 2:25
 "From Friends to Lovers" – 2:56
 "Time to Leave" – 3:51
 "I Am Down" – 4:11
 "Another Kiss" – 2:54
 "Pas Avec Toi"– 2:58
 "Runnaway" – 3:43
 "You're No Good" (Clint Ballard, Jr) – 3:06
 "Coney Island" – 3:26

Personnel
 Louise Basilien – bass
 Katty Besnard – guitar, vocals
 Marine Neuilly – guitar
 Anais Vandevyvere – drums

Production
 Kevin Bosley – assistant
 Alex Chow – artwork, design
 Scott Hull – mastering
 Marvin Scott Jarrett – photography
 Claudius Mittendorfer – mixing
 Jake Sinclair – producer
 Butch Walker – producer, audio production

References

2009 albums
Plastiscines albums